The Ascension Island transmitting station is a shortwave transmitting facility in the English Bay area of Ascension Island. The facility was opened by the BBC in 1966 to broadcast the BBC World Service to Africa and South America. The site is owned and operated by Encompass Digital Media.

History
The Ascension Island relay station began broadcasting on July 3, 1966 in order to provide BBC World Service broadcasts to West and Central Africa and South America. Ascension Island was chosen because of it's location. Historically Ascension Island has been used as a strategic location for shipping and later communications.

Services transmitted
The main user of the facility is the BBC World Service, it is also used by Voice of America. Around 250 hours of content is broadcast from the Ascension Island transmitting station every week. The majority of content is broadcast in English however content in French, Hausa and Bambara is also broadcast.

References

Shortwave radio stations